On 10 May 1917, the association football teams of the Philippines and Japan faced each other at the 1917 Far Eastern Games. The tournament was contested by Japan, the Philippines and China. The Japanese team was represented by a selection from the Tokyo Higher Normal School. Paulino Alcántara, a renowned football player, was part of the Philippine squad who led the Philippines to its biggest recorded victory in an international football match which also became Japan's biggest defeat.  However, this match is not recognized as an official international match by the Japan Football Association.

Details

Aftermath
At least one milestone was reached, aside from the record scoreline made in this match. Haruyoshi Fujii became Japan's first goalscorer in an international competitive football match by scoring Japan's two goals.

The Philippines later faced the Republic of China in a de facto final, but this was abandoned after 55 minutes; after the Chinese converted a penalty making the scoreline 3–0, the Filipino goalkeeper punched the Chinese goalscorer in the face, which started a brawl involving both sides.

See also
 Japan 15–0 Philippines

References

Record association football wins
1917 in Asian football
Japan national football team matches
Philippines national football team matches
May 1917 sports events
1910s in Tokyo